Catocala lehmanni is a moth in the family Erebidae. It is found in China (Sichuan).

References

lehmanni
Moths described in 2008
Moths of Asia